Dean Alexander Spanos (born May 26, 1950) is the chairman and owner of the National Football League (NFL)'s San Diego / Los Angeles Chargers franchise. He is the son of Alex Spanos, who purchased majority interest in the team in 1984. Spanos took over daily operations from his father in 1994, becoming president and CEO, until he passed operations to his own sons in 2015. Spanos took over full ownership after his father's death in 2018.

Early life and education
Spanos was raised in Stockton, California, the son of Alex Spanos and Faye Papafaklis, both of Greek ancestry. 

He attended Lincoln High School where he earned varsity letters in football and golf and received the Lincoln High Hall of Fame Award. He graduated from the University of the Pacific in 1972.

Chargers
Spanos was named team president and chief executive officer of the Chargers by his father in early 1994. Under Spanos's leadership, the Chargers won 113 games between 2004 and 2014, which included five AFC West championships and four playoff game wins. 

In May 2015, Spanos ceded control of the team to his sons, John and A.G., though he stayed on as chairman to oversee a failed new stadium process. 

After a proposed ballot measure for a hotel tax financed stadium plan in downtown San Diego failed in November 2016 with only 43 percent approval, the Chargers weighed their option to return to the Los Angeles market.

In January 2017, Spanos exercised the option to relocate the team to Los Angeles. The move was met with criticism by San Diego due to not being able to find a stadium solution in the city, despite 15 years of failed proposals blocked by city officials and business leaders.

The team's temporary headquarters is currently in Costa Mesa under a 10-year lease until a permanent location in the Los Angeles area is acquired. The 2017 through 2019 seasons were played at a soccer stadium,  Dignity Health Sports Park (known as StubHub Center until 2019).

In 2020, construction was completed on the Chargers' new stadium, SoFi Stadium, which is shared with the Los Angeles Rams. The venue is owned and operated by StadCo LA, LLC., a joint partnership with Kroenke Sports & Entertainment and the Los Angeles Chargers.

Philanthropy
In 1999, the family launched Chargers Champions through the Community Foundation to support local schools. 

In 2011 Spanos held a fundraiser for Rick Perry at a private event at Sacramento. In 2014, the Spanoses donated $500,000 to the University of California, San Diego for the Alex G. Spanos Athletic Performance Center. The donation brought their total support to UCSD to $1.6 million. 

He also led the Chargers to partner with the Susan G. Komen Foundation in San Diego in honor of his wife Susie, who is a breast cancer survivor. During his tenure with the Chargers, Spanos created The Chargers Champions All-Star Gala to recognize high school students and educators in the San Diego area. After Hurricane Harvey in 2017, Spanos and the Chargers donated $500,000 to hurricane relief.

Awards and recognition
In 2016, Spanos was ranked number 21 on the USA Today list of 100 most important  people in the NFL. He was an honoree at the American Hellenic Council's (AHC) Annual Awards Gala, which recognizes individuals from the Greek-American community.

He was appointed to the board of the John F. Kennedy Center for the Performing Arts in Washington, D.C. in 2006. Spanos received the 2005 Distinguished American Award from the San Diego Chapter of the National Football Foundation. He was also awarded the 2004 Jose A. Cota Award for philanthropy and the Chargers support of law enforcement.

In 2002, Spanos was awarded the Ellis Island Medal of Honor, 16 years after his father received the award. He also was inducted into the DeMolay International Alumni Hall of Fame.

References

External links
 Biography from Chargers.com  

1950 births
Living people
Los Angeles Chargers executives
People from Stockton, California
American people of Greek descent
Los Angeles Chargers owners